Stigmella caesurifasciella is a moth of the family Nepticulidae. It is only known from Honshu and Kyushu in Japan, but is probably also present in China.

The larvae feed on Cyclobalanopsis glauca and Cyclobalanopsis acuta. They mine the leaves of their host plant.

External links
Nepticulidae (Lepidoptera) in China, 1. Introduction and Stigmella (Schrank) feeding on Fagaceae

Nepticulidae
Moths of Japan
Moths described in 1985